Whizzard of Ow is an animated short film that was released on November 1, 2003. It was directed by Bret Haaland. It stars Wile E. Coyote and the Road Runner, and is the first short of these characters produced after the death of Chuck Jones on February 22, 2002. The film was included in the DVD release of Looney Tunes: Back in Action as a special feature.

Plot 
The short begins with a magical battle between two different stereotypes of sorcerers (a short Gandalf-like wizard that holds a large "Acme Book of Magic" in one hand and a staff in the other, and a tall Doctor Strange-like warlock  with a black cat on his shoulder) where they zap each other until they zap each other in a final energy blast. Their possessions escape unharmed and fall on Wile E. Coyote, just as he was about to catch Road Runner, causing considerable pain to him (especially the cat, who viciously scratches to his face out of fear). Coyote notices the ACME book of magic and becomes delightfully happy (as his hare-like ears fall off), as he now has a new weapon against the Road Runner.

1: The first spell that Coyote tries is to turn the black cat into a giant feral beast to catch the Roadrunner. He succeeds, and the cat transforms into a huge black panther, but unfortunately, he proves to be too feral, and he quickly slices the coyote into strips, deflating Coyote like a balloon.

2: Coyote buys an ACME flying broomstick and, after some trial and error, begins to chase the Road Runner through the air. However, when he enters a gloomy tunnel, Coyote mistakes his coughing beeps with a horn of an approaching truck and suddenly changes his direction to the sky, only to be hit by two meteorites and get his broom "out of gas". Wile E. starts to fall and dials the Acme Flying Broom Customer Service on his phone for help but gets a recording telling him all operators were busy. After a long drop, Coyote manages to stop his broomstick in mid-air and land safely, but as he feels relieved, he gets scared off a cliff by the Road Runner and becomes a victim to gravity as usual.

3: In his second spell, Coyote tries to turn himself in a giant, but much to his chagrin, the spell only affects his head, whose weight crushes his own body.

4: Coyote uses invisible ink to make a bomb transparent and disguise it as a crystal ball in order to lure an unsuspecting Road Runner to his death. However, the fake crystal ball actually works and the Road Runner sees Coyote's future where he's caught—a future that quickly turns into reality when the bomb rolls straight to him and explodes.

5: In his third spell, Coyote learns levitation and uses his classical "seeds trap" to temporarily stop the Road Runner and smash him with a large rock. Unfortunately, the rock does not fall under his command, giving enough time for the Road Runner to finish his lunch and leave. After several unsuccessful attempts to make the rock fall, Coyote leaves in disgust, only for the rock to follow and crush him.

6: In his last spell, Coyote once again tries to shape shift the cat into another creature, this time into a Pegasus, to once again chase the Road Runner though the air, but they inadvertently fly through a load of poisonous snakes (prompting the Pegasus to use the Coyote as a stick to get rid of them), and to make matters worse, the Pegasus quickly turns into a flying carpet, and much to Coyote's anguish, they fly straight to a reserve of scorpions and to a field of cacti. The carpet is then turned into a monitor lizard (who promptly devours his snout), a lawnmower, and then into a great white shark, and he and the Coyote land in a lake. However, it turns out that the reason for the cat's uncontrollable transformations was the Road Runner, who found the book of magic and decided to test his powers. He turns a mailbox into a gracious and beautiful female roadrunner and the two leave, walking and holding hands, while the Coyote is last seen running for his life on the surface of the lake from the pursuing shark.

Production 
This Coyote and Roadrunner short is notable for being the only one so far to use the real taxonomic names Geococcyx californianus (greater roadrunner) and Canis latrans (coyote) instead of the usual fake-Latin names.

The animation was produced by Rough Draft Studios.

External links 
 

2003 films
2003 animated films
2003 short films
2000s American animated films
2000s animated short films
Looney Tunes shorts
Films about magic
Rough Draft Studios films
Films about shapeshifting
Wile E. Coyote and the Road Runner films
Films about witchcraft
Films about wizards
Films scored by John Frizzell (composer)
Warner Bros. Animation animated short films
2000s Warner Bros. animated short films
2000s English-language films